The Oklahoma Bar Association (OBA) is the integrated (mandatory) bar association of the U.S. state of Oklahoma.

History 
The Oklahoma Territory Bar Association and the Indian Territory Bar Association merged in 1904 to form the Oklahoma Bar Association. After statehood in November 1907, the Oklahoma Legislature recognized the Association; however, it repealed the enacting legislation in 1938.  In 1939 the Oklahoma Supreme Court reorganized the association and made membership mandatory to practice law in Oklahoma.

Structure
The Oklahoma Bar Association is governed by a 17-member Board of Governors, whose members are lawyers elected by OBA members and meet monthly. Day-to-day operations are managed by an Executive Director and a staff of both attorneys and non-attorneys.

OBA enforces the rule that Oklahoma lawyers must complete 12 credits of Continuing Legal Education every year.

The bimonthly Oklahoma Bar Journal, established in 1930, is OBA's official member publication.

Although an arm of the Oklahoma Supreme Court, OBA does not receive any appropriations from the Oklahoma Legislature or other public or tax-related revenues.

References

American state bar associations
Government of Oklahoma
1904 establishments in Oklahoma Territory
Organizations established in 1904
Organizations based in Oklahoma City